Derek Edward Pratt (31 October 1925 – 10 January 1997) was an English cricketer. Pratt was a right-handed batsman who bowled leg break. He was born at Balham, London.

Pratt made his first-class debut for Surrey against Cambridge University in 1954 at Fenner's. He made eight further first-class appearances for Surrey, the last of which came against Oxford University in 1957. In his nine first-class appearances for Surrey, he scored 171 runs at an average of 21.37, with a high score of 33. With the ball, he took 13 wickets at a bowling average of 30.15, with best figures of 6/119. These figures represented his only five wicket haul and came against the Combined Services in 1956 at The Oval. He joined Bedfordshire in 1958, making his debut for the county against Cambridgeshire in the Minor Counties Championship. He played minor counties cricket for Bedfordshire from 1958 to 1963, making a total of 35 appearances, the last of which came against Staffordshire.

He died at Banstead, Surrey, on 10 January 1997. His brother, Ronald, also played first-class cricket.

References

External links
Derek Pratt at ESPNcricinfo
Derek Pratt at CricketArchive

1925 births
1997 deaths
People from Balham
English cricketers
Surrey cricketers
Bedfordshire cricketers